The first season of Offspring, an Australian drama television series, began airing on 15 August 2010 on Network Ten. The season concluded on 21 November 2010 after 13 episodes and the Pilot – Telemovie.

Offspring is the story of the impossible loves of 30-something obstetrician Nina Proudman (Asher Keddie), and her fabulously messy family, as they navigate the chaos of modern life. The show mixes conventional narrative drama with flashbacks, graphic animation and fantasy sequences. 

The first series aired Sundays at 8:30 pm in Australia. The season was released on DVD as a five disc set under the title of Offspring: The Complete First Series and Feature-Length Telemovie on 1 December 2010.

On 21 November 2010, Network Ten aired the final two episodes as a two-hour season finale as two parts. However the episodes have been released separately on iTunes and on the DVD release of Series 1.

Cast

Regular
Asher Keddie as Nina Proudman
Kat Stewart as Billie Proudman
Don Hany as Chris Havel
Deborah Mailman as Cherie Butterfield
Eddie Perfect as Mick Holland
Richard Davies as Jimmy Proudman
Linda Cropper as Geraldine Proudman
and John Waters as Darcy Proudman

Recurring
Jane Harber as Zara Perkich
Alicia Gardiner as Kim Akerholt
Lachy Hulme as Martin Clegg
Leah De Niese as Odile
Christopher Morris as Brendan Wright
Marta Kaczmarek as Sonja
John Wood as Gareth Butterfield
Damon Herriman as Boyd Carlisle
Kestie Morassi as Ivy
Kate Atkinson as Renee
Kate Box as Alice Havel
Sacha Horler as Stacey
Matilda Brown as Chloe Fraser
Paul Denny as Sam Jenkins
Archie Flegeltaub as Ray Proudman
Tahlia Accornero as Lucy Havel

Guest stars
Ian "Dicko" Dickson as Ian "Dicko" Dickson
Brian Mannix as Guitar Man
Shaun Micallef as Lachlan

Episodes

DVD release

References

2010 Australian television seasons